Gilman (also Fitzdale) is an unincorporated community and census-designated place (CDP) in the town of Lunenburg, Essex County, Vermont, United States. It was first listed as a CDP prior to the 2020 census. The community has a post office with ZIP code 05904.

Notable people
George L. Fox, who was one of the Four Chaplains, was the minister of a Methodist church in Gilman.

Notes

Census-designated places in Essex County, Vermont
Census-designated places in Vermont
Unincorporated communities in Essex County, Vermont
Unincorporated communities in Vermont